Puteri Indonesia 2010, the 15th Annual Puteri Indonesia beauty pageant, was held in Jakarta Convention Center, Jakarta, Indonesia on October 8, 2010. Thirty eight contestants from all 33 provinces of Indonesia competed for the title of Puteri Indonesia, one of the most prominent beauty pageant titles in the country. Qory Sandioriva, Puteri Indonesia 2009 from Aceh crowned her successor Nadine Alexandra Dewi Ames of Jakarta SCR 4 at Assembly Hall, Jakarta Convention Center, Jakarta. Ames is going to represent Indonesia at the Miss Universe 2011 in  São Paulo, Brazil, while the first and second runners-up will represent the nation at the Miss International 2011 and the Miss Asia Pacific World 2011 respectively.

The event was broadcast live on Indonesian television network, Indosiar. Indonesian Minister for Female Empowerment and Child Protection, Linda Gumelar, as well as Ximena Navarrete, Miss Universe 2010, was present during the event.

Results
The Crowns of Puteri Indonesia Title Holders
 Puteri Indonesia 2010 (Miss Universe Indonesia 2010) 
 Puteri Indonesia Lingkungan 2010 (Miss International Indonesia 2010)
 Puteri Indonesia Pariwisata 2010 (Miss Asia Pacific Indonesia 2010)

Contestants

See also
Miss Indonesia 2010

References

External links 

 Official Puteri Indonesia Official Website
 Official Miss Universe Official Website
 Miss International Official Website
 Official Miss Supranational Official Website

2010
October 2010 events in Indonesia
2010 in Indonesia
2010 beauty pageants